The 1985 Men's Junior World Handball Championship was the fifth edition of the IHF Men's Junior World Championship, held in Italy from 7 to 15 December 1985.

Preliminary round

Group A

Group B

Group C

Group D

Classification round

Main round
All points and goals against the team from the same preliminary round were carried over.

Group I

Group II

Placement games

Eleventh place game

Ninth place game

Seventh place game

Fifth place game

Third place game

Final

Final ranking

External links
IHF report
Results on todor66.com

1985 Junior
Men's Junior World Handball Championship
International handball competitions hosted by Italy
1985 in Italian sport
December 1985 sports events in Europe